In My Head is the sixth studio album by American band Black Flag. It was released in 1985 on SST Records, and was their final studio album before their breakup in 1986. The CD reissue adds three of the four songs that later appeared on the I Can See You EP, replicating the original 1985 cassette release which came out concurrent to the LP.

After building a reputation for confrontational hardcore punk, late-era Black Flag turned to a more experimental, -inflected sound, in particular on their last two albums.  Greg Ginn intended In My Head to be his first solo album.  The cover is a collage of six drawings by Raymond Pettibon.

Reception

The album received very positive reviews upon release. Robert Palmer, writing for The New York Times, found the music to be "intriguingly, sometimes dazzlingly fresh and sophisticated, but the band hasn't had to sacrifice an iota of the raw intensity and directness that are punk's spiritual center." He compared the "polyphony of shifting shapes that is the principal guitar motif in the brilliant 'White Hot to "listening to the once-revolutionary guitar break from the Yardbirds' mid-60's hit 'Shapes of Things' while one's turntable goes up in flames." "Yet for all its sophistication," he continued, "this is jagged, abrasive rock and roll, music hard and direct enough to appeal to any punk or hard-rock fan. [...] 'In My Head' is the sound of heavy metal rock as it could be but almost never is, metal without the posturing, the pointless displays of fretboard prowess, the bashing rhythm sections and banal lyrics that have become endemic to the idiom." It also notably received a full score from the English music magazine Sounds, which found it to be even better than the band's debut.

Retrospective reviews have also been largely positive. Punknews found the album to be more innovative & better produced than its predecessors, while John Dougan of AllMusic called it "some of the best contemporary rock music extant." Louder Sound called it "one of the group's finest albums, with [its] foreboding title track its most gloriously tortured moment. [...] Healthy people don't make music like this, and indeed, soon after its release Black Flag were done." "Early Black Flag releases like Nervous Breakdown, Damaged, and My War spawned tons of imitators," wrote BrooklynVegan, "and there's no way to overstate how influential they are, but In My Head has something else going for it. Over three decades later, you rarely hear other music that sounds like this."

Track listing

 Tracks 6, 7 and 12 reissued in 1989 on the I Can See You EP.

Personnel
Henry Rollins – vocals
Greg Ginn – guitar
Kira Roessler – bass, background vocals 
Bill Stevenson – drums
Raymond Pettibon – artwork

References

Works cited

 
 

Black Flag (band) albums
1985 albums
SST Records albums
Albums produced by Bill Stevenson (musician)